Ctenoimbricata is an extinct genus of bilaterally symmetrical echinoderm, which lived during the early Middle Cambrian period of what is now Spain. It contains one species, Ctenoimbricata spinosa. It may be the most basal known echinoderm. It resembles the extinct ctenocystoids and cinctans, particularly the basal ctenocystoid Courtessolea. Ctenoimbricata is interpreted as a deposit-feeding pharyngeal basket feeder.

References

Prehistoric echinoderm genera
Cambrian echinoderms
Fossil taxa described in 2012

Cambrian genus extinctions